An Essay on Pornography is a 1973 Australian film.

External links

An Essay on Pornography at Oz Movies

1973 films
Australian documentary films
1970s English-language films